A persecutory delusion or persecution complex is a common type of delusional condition in which the affected person believes that harm is going to occur to oneself by a persecutor, despite a clear lack of evidence. The person may believe that they are being targeted by an individual or a group of people. Persecution delusions are very diverse in terms of content and vary from the possible, albeit improbable, to the completely bizarre. The delusion can be found in a multitude of disorders, being more usual in psychotic disorders, such as schizophrenia, schizoaffective disorder and delusional disorder.

Persecutory delusion is at the more severe side of the paranoia spectrum and it often induces anxiety, depression and sleep disturbance. Individuals with this delusion have also been found to have low self-esteem. Persecutory delusions have a high percentage to be acted upon, such as not leaving the house due to fear or acting violently. Persecutory type is a common type of delusion and is more prevalent in males. Theory of mind deficits are present in people with this delusion.

As with others disorders it is thought that persecutory delusions are a combination of genetic and environment factors. This type of delusion is treatment-resistant.  The most common methods of treatment are cognitive behavioral therapy, medications, namely first and second generation antipsychotics, and in severe cases, hospitalization.

Characteristics
Persecutory delusions are persistent, distressing beliefs that one is or will be harmed, that continue even when evidence of the contrary is presented. This condition is often seen in schizophrenia, schizoaffective disorder and delusional disorder but can also be found in manic episodes of bipolar disorder, psychotic depression, and some personality disorders. Alongside delusional jealousy, persecutory delusions are the most common types of delusion in males and are a frequent symptom of psychosis. Delusions are often paired with anxiety, depression, and disturbed sleep. People with persecutory delusions have an increased difficulty in attributing mental states to oneself in addition to others and oftentimes misread others' intentions as a result.

The degree of functionality in people who suffer from persecutory delusions is considered normal, though people who present with this form of delusion are often in the bottom 2% in terms of psychological well-being. A correlation has also been found between the delta of imagined power the persecutor has and the control the sufferer has over the delusion. Those with a higher delta between the two factors have a higher rate of depression and anxiety. In urban environments, going outside leads people with this delusion to have a major increases in levels of paranoia, anxiety, depression and lower self-esteem. People with this delusion often live a more inactive life and are at a higher risk of developing high blood pressure, diabetes and heart disease, having a lifespan 14.5 years less than the average in their area as a result.

Those with persecutory delusions have the highest risk of acting upon those thoughts, such as refusing to leave their house out of the fear of being harmed, or acting violently due to a perceived threat. Safety behaviors are also frequently found - individuals who feel threatened perform actions in order to avert their feared delusion from occurring. Avoidance is commonly observed: individuals may avoid entering areas where they believe they might be harmed, such as malls and other public areas. Some may also try to lessen the threat, such as only leaving the house with a trusted person, reducing their visibility by taking alternative routes, increasing their vigilance by looking up and down the street, or acting as if they would resist attack by being prepared to strike out.

Causes
A study assessing schizophrenia patients with persecutory delusions found remarkably higher levels of childhood emotional abuse within those people but found no differences of trauma, physical abuse, physical neglect and sexual abuse. Biological elements, such as chemical imbalances in the brain and alcohol and drug use are a contributing factor to persecutory delusions, genetic elements are also thought to influence, family members with schizophrenia and delusional disorder are at a higher risk of developing persecutory delusion.

Treatment
Persecutory delusions has been difficult to treat and is therapy resistant. Medications for schizophrenia are often used, especially when positive symptoms are present. Both first-generation antipsychotics and second-generation antipsychotics may be useful. Since these delusions are often accompanied with worry, using cognitive behavioral therapy to tackle this thought has shown to reduce the frequency of the delusions itself, improvement of well-being and less rumination. Vitamin B12 supplements have shown positive results in treating patients with persecutory delusion. Virtual reality cognitive therapy has a way to treat persecutory delusions, has shown a reduction in  paranoid thinking and distress. Virtual reality permits patients to be immersed in world that replicates real life but with a decreased amount of fear, patients are then proposed to fully explore the environment without engaging in safety behaviors, thus challenging their perceived threat has unfounded.

Diagnosis 
The Diagnostic and Statistical Manual of Mental Disorders (DSM-5) enumerates seven types of delusions and the International Classification of Diseases (ICD-11) defines fifteen types of delusions both including persecutory delusion. They state that it's a common type of delusion that includes the belief that the person or someone close to the person is being maliciously treated, this encompasses thoughts that oneself has been drugged, spied upon, harmed, mocked, cheated, conspired against, persecuted, harassed and so on and may procure justice by making reports, taking action or responding violently.

Two psychologists, Daniel Freeman and Philippa Garety have advanced a diagnostic table for persecutory delusion divided in two criteria that must be met: the individual believes that harm is going to occur to oneself at the present or future, and that the harm is made by a persecutor. There's also points of clarification, the delusion has to cause distress to the individual, only harm to someone close to the person doesn't count as a persecutory delusion, the individual must believe that the persecutor will attempt to harm him or her and delusions of reference do not count within the category of persecutory beliefs.

Legal aspects 
When the focus is to remedy some injustice by legal action, persecutory delusions are sometimes called "querulous paranoia". Querulous paranoia is found more frequently on males between 40 and 60 years old.

In cases where reporters of stalking behavior have been judged to be making false reports, a majority of them were judged to be delusional.

See also 

Stalking
Grandiose delusions
Narcissistic decompensation
Paranoia
 In object relations theory see: splitting (psychology), paranoid-schizoid and depressive positions, and paranoid anxiety
Querulant

References 

Paranoia
Schizophrenia
Delusional disorders